Rikard Magnussen (2 April 1885  26 May 1948) was a Danish sculptor.

Early life and education
Magnussen was born on 2 April 1885 in Copenhagen, the son of bookkeeper Sophus Oscar M. (18491926) and Christiane Marie Weybøll (18531930). He completed his schooling in 1903. He was then trained as a sculptor, first for eight months under Elna Borch in 1904 and then under Stephan Sinding. He later worked on an off for Vilhelm Bissen 1913.

Career
Magnussen was a strong defender of the naturalistic style at a time when modernism came to play a still more dominant role on the art scene.

He was a member of Charlottenborg's censor committee and a board member both of Dansk Billedhugger Samfund, Kunstforeningen af 18. November and Foreningen for National Kunst, He was an art critic at København (192026), Nationaltidende and other newspapers. He was a member of Foreningen til Hovedstadens Forskønnelse in 192842 and served as its president in 1929–34.

His writings included his memoirs Billedhugger-Minder (1933), monographies about Janus la Cour (1928), Carl Bloch (1931), Christian Molsted (1935), Svend Hammershøi (b. 1936) and Godfred Christensen (I-II, 1939–41) as well as I Thorvaldsens Livsanskuelse (1936) about Bertel Thorvaldsen and Søren Kierkegaard set udefra (1942). He was editor of National Kunst (1940) and Danmarks nationale Malerkunst (1941).

Personal life
Magnussen married royal translator Ellen Reck (6 May 1879 – 9 January 1956), a daughter of military officer and businessman Anders Borch R. (1850–1927) and Marie Johanne Jacobine Qvist (1854–1927), on 10 July 1912 in Hellerup. He was made a Knight in the Order of the Dannebrog in 1938. He died on 26 May 1948 in Copenhagen and is buried in the city's Western Cemetery.

List of works

 Munken og evighedsfuglen (gips, uexhibited 1908)
 Martin Luther (plaster, 1915)
 Den gode Hyrde (plaster, 1919)
 'Pygmalion og Galathea (exhibited 1919)

Public art, monuments and memorials
 Ole Syversen Monument, Fælledparken, Copenhagen
 Frederik Ditlev Reventlow, Horslunde (1017)
 Emil Piper Memorial, Kongens Lyngby (1928)
 Sophie Magdalene, Hørsholm Slotspark, Hørsholm (1932)
 Frederik VIII and Louise, Charlottenlund Slotspark, Charlottenlund (1938)
 Christian, Count Moltke, Vallø Castle Park (1942)

Portrait busts
 Jacob Texière (plaster, 1907)
 Juliette Price (1910, marble, Royal Danish Theatre)
 Th. Skat Rørdam (plaster, 1911–12)
 August Krogh (1918, bronze, Zoological Laboratory, University of Copenhagen)
 C.A. Olesen (1921, bronze, Danish Distillers)
 Harald Kidde (plaster, 1925)
 Søren Kierkegaard (1929)

References 

20th-century Danish sculptors
20th-century male artists
Artists from Copenhagen
1885 births
1948 deaths